Neural dust is a term used to refer to nanometer-sized devices operated as wirelessly powered nerve sensors; it is a type of brain–computer interface. The sensors may be used to study, monitor, or control the nerves and muscles and to remotely monitor neural activity. In practice, a medical treatment could introduce thousands of neural dust devices into human brains. The term is derived from "smart dust", as the sensors used as neural dust may also be defined by this concept.

Background 
The design for neural dust was first proposed in a 2011 paper from the University of California, Berkeley Wireless Research Center, that described both the challenges and outstanding benefits of creating a long lasting wireless brain computer interface (BCI). While the history of BCI begins with the invention of the electroencephalogram by Hans Berger in 1924, the term did not appear in scientific literature until the 1970s. The hallmark research of the field came from the University of California, Los Angeles (UCLA), following a research grant from the National Science Foundation.

While neural dust does fall under the category of BCI, it also could be used in the field of neuroprosthetics (also known as neural prosthetics). While the terms can sometimes be used interchangeably, the main difference is that while BCI generally interface neural activity directly to a computer, neuroprosthetics tend to connect activity in the central nervous system to a device meant to replace the function of a missing or impaired body part.

Function

Components 
The principal components of the neural dust system include the sensor nodes (neural dust), which aim to be in the 10-100 µm3 scale, and a sub-cranial interrogator, which would sit below the dura mater and would provide both power and a communication link to the neural dust. The neural dust motes consist of a pair of recording electrodes, a custom transistor, and a piezoelectric sensor. The piezoelectric crystal is capable of recording brain activity from the extracellular space, and converting it into an electrical signal.

Data and Power Transfer 
While many forms of BCI exist, neural dust is in a class of its own due to its size, wireless capability, and use of ultrasound technology. While many comparable devices use electromagnetic waves (such as radio frequencies) to interact with wireless neural sensors, use of ultrasound offers the advantages of higher spatial resolution as well as decreased attenuation in the tissue. This results in higher penetration depths (and therefore easier communication with the sub-cranial communicator), as well as reduced unwanted energy being distributed into the body's tissues due to scattering or absorption. This excess energy would take the form of heat, which would cause damage to the surrounding tissue. Use of ultrasound also permits greater scaling of sensor nodes, allowing for sizes less than 100 µm, which provides great possibility in the realm of implantable electronics.

Backscatter Communication 
Due to the extremely small size of the neural dust motes, it would be impractical and nearly impossible to create a functional transmitter in the sensor itself. Thus backscatter communication, adopted from radio frequency identification (RFID) technologies, is employed. In RFID passive, battery-less tags are capable of absorbing and reflecting radio frequency (RF) energy when in close proximity to a RF interrogator, which is a device that transmits RF energy. As they reflect the RF energy back to the interrogator, they are capable of modulating the frequency, and in doing so, encoding information. Neural dust employs this method by having the sub-dural communicator send out an ultrasound pulse that is then reflected by the neural dust sensors. The piezoelectric crystal detects the neuronal signal from its location in the extracellular space, and the ultrasound energy reflected back to the interrogator would be modulated in a way that would communicate the recorded activity.

In one proposed model of the neural dust sensor, the transistor model allowed for a method of separating between local field potentials and action potential "spikes", which would allow for a greatly diversified wealth of data acquirable from the recordings.

Clinical and health applications

Neural prosthetics 
Some examples of neural prostheses include cochlear implants that can aid in restoring hearing, artificial silicon retina microchips that have shown to be effective in treating retinal degeneration from retinitis pigmentosa, and even motor prostheses that could offer the capability for movement in those affected with quadriplegia or disorders like amyotrophic lateral sclerosis. The use of neural dust in conjunction with motor prostheses could allow for a much finer control of movement.

Electrostimulation 
While methods of electrical stimulation of nerves and brain tissue have already been employed for some time, the size and wireless nature of neural dust allows for advancement in clinical applications of the technique. Importantly, because traditional methods of neurostimulation and certain forms of nerve stimulation such as spinal cord stimulation use implanted electrodes that remain connected to wires, the risk of infection and scarring is high. While these risks are not a factor in the use of neural dust, the challenge of applying sufficient electrical current to the sensor node, is still present.

Sleep Apnea

Electrostimulation devices have already shown some efficacy in treating Obstructive Sleep Apnea (OSA). Researchers that used a surgically implanted electrostimulation device on patients with severe OSA found significant improvement over a 12-month period of treatment with the device. Stimulation of the phrenic nerve has also been shown to be effective in reducing central sleep apnea.

Bladder Control in Paraplegics 
Electrical stimulation devices have been effective in allowing spinal cord injury patients to have improved ability to urinate and defecate by using radio-linked implants to stimulate the sacral anterior root area of the spine

Epilepsy 
Electrical stimulation therapy in patients with epilepsy has been a well established procedure for some time, being traced back to as early as the 1950s. A paramount goal of the American Epilepsy Society is the continued development of automated brain electrical stimulation (also known as contingent, or closed loop stimulation), which provides seizure-halting electrical stimulation based on brain patterns that indicate a seizure is about to happen. This provides a much better treatment of the disorder than stimulation that is based on an estimate of when the seizure might occur. While vagal nerve stimulation is often a target area for treatment of epileptic seizures, there has been research into the efficacy of stimulation in the hippocampus, thalamus, and subthalamic nucleus. Closed-loop cortical neuromodulation has also been investigated as a treatment technique for Parkinson's disease

References 

Brain–computer interfacing
Human–computer interaction
Neural engineering
Neuroprosthetics